The Southern Ohio Correctional Facility (commonly referred to as Lucasville) is a maximum security prison located just outside Lucasville in Scioto County, Ohio.  The prison was constructed in 1972. As of 2022, the warden is Donald Redwood.

The prison is perhaps best known for its April 1993 riot, in which a total of 450 prisoners rioted, resulting in an 11-day standoff between rioters and law enforcement. One corrections officer and nine inmates were killed during the riot. The riot has been described as one of the largest crises in Ohio prison history and one of the longest prison sieges in U.S. history.

Composition
The eastern portion resides in Jefferson Township, while the western portion is in Valley Township.

1993 riot

On Easter Sunday, April 11, 1993, 450 Lucasville inmates, including an unlikely alliance of the prison gangs: Gangster Disciples, Black Muslims and the Aryan Brotherhood, rioted and took over the facility for 11 days. The prisoners' main concerns were serious overcrowding and mismanagement of the facility and Muslim frustration stemming from mandated tuberculosis testing. In the Netflix documentary series Captive, inmate Siddique Abdullah Hasan (Carlos Sanders) claims that Muslim prisoners refused the test because it contained phenol, and therefore went against Islamic restrictions concerning the handling and consumption of alcohol. Investigations conducted after the riot found that the gangs were also collaborating to murder inmates accused of being informants. One corrections officer and nine inmates were killed during the riot. Five inmates believed to have been informants were beaten to death at the start of the riot. Two inmates were repeatedly stabbed to death and a third had paper and plastic stuffed into his mouth before being strangled to death by cords.

During negotiations, the inmates did not feel they were being taken seriously and there was discussion of killing a corrections officer in retaliation. Though the group never reached a decision on the killing, one of the prisoners decided to act. According to the prosecution, Officer Robert Vallandingham, who had been taken hostage, was handcuffed and strangled with a dumbbell from the prison weight room. However, testimony by Dr. Richard Fardal, Franklin County Deputy Coroner, disputed the claim that Officer Vallandingham was killed by a weight, saying that there was "no injury to the voice box or the trachea" and that "Mr. Vallandingham died solely and exclusively as a result of ligature strangulation." Testimonies vary as to which prisoner was responsible for his murder. During those 11 days, representatives from the Gangster Disciples, Black Muslims and Aryan Brotherhood met every day in an improvised leadership council.

The riot eventually ended after 11 days on April 21. Prison officials agreed to review the prisoners' complaints, which resulted in the prisoners' surrender.

Communications issues experienced during the response to the riot contributed to the state's decision to build an interoperable statewide radio system.

Lucasville Five

Five prisoners described as the riot leaders were sentenced to death for their roles during the riot. They were known as the Lucasville Five:

 Bomani Shakur (Keith LaMar) (born May 31, 1969, in Cleveland, Ohio), on Ohio Death Row, scheduled for execution on November 16, 2023.
 Siddique Abdullah Hasan (Carlos A. Sanders) (born January 4, 1963), on Ohio Death Row awaiting execution.
 Jason Harry Robb (born June 15, 1967), on Ohio Death Row awaiting execution.
 George W. Skatzes (born March 29, 1946), on Ohio Death Row awaiting execution.
 Namir Abdul Mateen (James Were) (born January 20, 1957), on Ohio Death Row awaiting execution.

Bomani Shakur (Keith LaMar), unaffiliated with any of the above-mentioned groups, was sentenced to death in 1995 for his leadership of a group who killed inmates during the riot. He denies his leadership and claims the State of Ohio suppressed evidence that could demonstrate his innocence. He was not present in L-6 during the majority of the riot, having been taken off the rec yard the first day by the State authorities and housed in the K block.

Following the riot, a class action was brought against the state officers, administrators and staff by a legal team headed by civil rights attorney Al Gerhardstein on behalf of the inmate victims of the riot. The state paid $4.1 million to settle the claims of the victims and agreed to a number of non-monetary terms as well, to remedy the overcrowding and mismanagement of the facility.

Bomani Shakur (Keith LaMar) is scheduled to be executed on November 16, 2023. He is currently imprisoned at the Ohio State Penitentiary along with Siddique Abdullah Hasan (Carlos Sanders), Jason Robb and Namir Abdul Mateen (James Were). George Skatzes is imprisoned at the Chillicothe Correctional Institution.

2011 related hunger strike
On January 3, 2011, LaMar and Sanders began a twelve-day, liquid-only hunger strike at the Ohio State Penitentiary supermax prison in Youngstown, Ohio. On January 4, 2011, Robb joined the hunger strike. The three death-row inmates were living in solitary confinement for 23 hours a day. Additionally, they were restricted from using the internet to access news databases, denied access to the prison stores, and prohibited from physical contact with family. LaMar, Sanders and Robb desired the same treatment as the other Ohio death row-inmates and protested for equal prison conditions. The three death-row inmates demanded that they be granted additional time outside of their cells, physical contact with family members and access to the prison stores for additional clothing and food. At the time of the strike, David Bobby, the prison warden, concluded that he would not meet any of the prisoners' demands. However, by January 14, 2011, Bobby presented the inmates with a signed statement detailing the future policy changes. Due to growing public support and pressure from organizations such as human rights and legal scholars, the American Civil Liberties Union, and the Center for Constitutional Rights, the prison was under pressure to change, which Binghamton University Sociology Professor Denis O'Hearn has credited as playing a decisive role in the hunger strike's success. The three inmates' demands were all granted, including limited physical contact with family, daily one hour phone calls, and additional time outside of the prison cell. By January 15, 2011, LaMar, Sanders and Robb had ended their hunger strike.

Death row
The Southern Ohio Correctional Facility is where condemned Ohio prisoners are executed; however, prisoners awaiting execution are not housed there on a long-term basis. Since the riots, the men's death row has been relocated three times. The first relocation was to the Mansfield Correctional Institution in Mansfield with the majority of inmates being moved later to the Ohio State Penitentiary, a supermax facility in Youngstown while a few remained at Mansfield. Currently, all but twelve condemned inmates are housed in a new death row unit at the Chillicothe Correctional Institution in Chillicothe. Six high-security inmates, four of whom were involved in the 1993 riot, remain at OSP with two others with serious medical conditions housed at the Franklin Medical Center in Columbus. Donna Roberts, the lone woman on Ohio's death row, as well as any future female prisoners sentenced to death, are and will be held at the Ohio Reformatory for Women in Marysville.

Notable inmates 
 Romell Broom, was on death row for the 1984 murder of Tryna Middleton. Broom survived a failed attempt to execute him in 2009, and later died in 2020 before a further execution attempt could take place.
 Ahmed Evans, Glenville shooter.
 T.J. Lane, perpetrator of the Chardon High School shooting. Has since been moved to Warren Correctional Institution.
 Thomas Dillon, serial killer responsible for five murders. Dillon died in 2011.
 James Ruppert, mass murderer who killed 11 family members on Easter 1975, sometimes called the Easter Sunday Massacre.

Executed inmates 

 Wilford Berry Jr., convicted murderer who was executed in 1999 after waiving his appeals. He became the first person executed in Ohio since 1963.
 Jay D. Scott, convicted murderer who was executed in 2001. He became the first person involuntarily executed in Ohio since 1963.
 Alton Coleman, serial killer and rapist who killed eight people along with his accomplice, Debra Brown. Executed in 2002.
 Robert Anthony Buell, suspected serial killer who raped and strangled at least two young girls. Executed in 2002.
 William Wickline, serial killer who committed at least three dismemberment-slayings. Executed in 2004.
 Willie Williams, mass murderer and suspected serial killer who murdered three rival drug dealers and a friend of one of the dealers. Executed in 2005.
 Glenn Lee Benner II, convicted murderer who raped and murdered two women and raped and tried to murder two other women. Executed in 2006.
 Jeffrey Lundgren, mass murderer and cult family who murdered a family of five. Executed in 2006.
 Richard Cooey, convicted murderer who raped and killed two women. Executed in 2008.
 John Fautenberry, serial killer who murdered at least five people across four states. Executed in 2009.
 Frank G. Spisak Jr., Neo-Nazi serial killer who murdered at least three people in a series of racist and anti-Semitic shootings. Executed in 2011.

See also 
 Capital punishment in Ohio

References

External links

Ohio Historical Society, 2005, "Lucasville Prison Riot", Ohio History Central: An Online Encyclopedia of Ohio History
Hedges, Chris (February 22, 2015). We Kill Our Revolutionaries. (On the April 1993 uprising). Truthdig

Prisons in Ohio
Prison uprisings in the United States
Riots and civil disorder in Ohio
1993 riots
Capital punishment in Ohio
Buildings and structures in Scioto County, Ohio
Execution sites in the United States
1972 establishments in Ohio